This is a list of electoral divisions and wards in the ceremonial county of Somerset in South West England. All changes since the re-organisation of local government following the passing of the Local Government Act 1972 are shown. The number of councillors elected for each electoral division or ward is shown in brackets.

Unitary authority councils

Bath and North East Somerset

Wards from 1 April 1996 (first election 4 May 1995) to 6 May 1999:

Wards from 6 May 1999 to 2 May 2019:

Wards from 2 May 2019 to 1 April 2023:

North Somerset

Wards from 1 April 1996 (first election 4 May 1995) to 6 May 1999:

Wards from 6 May 1999 to 7 May 2015:

† minor boundary changes in 2011

Wards from 7 May 2015 to 1 April 2023:

Somerset

Electoral divisions from 1 April 2023 (first election 5 May 2022):

Former county councils

Avon

Electoral Divisions from 1 April 1974 (first election 12 April 1973) to 7 May 1981:

Electoral Divisions from 7 May 1981 to 1 April 1996 (county abolished):

Somerset

Electoral Divisions from 1 April 1974 (first election 12 April 1973) to 7 May 1981:

Electoral Divisions from 7 May 1981 to 7 June 2001:

Electoral Divisions from 7 June 2001 to 2 May 2013:

Electoral Divisions from 2 May 2013 to 1 April 2023:

Former district councils

Bath

Wards from 1 April 1974 (first election 7 June 1973) to 6 May 1976:

Wards from 6 May 1976 to 1 April 1996 (district abolished):

Mendip

Wards from 1 April 1974 (first election 7 June 1973) to 3 May 1979:

Wards from 3 May 1979 to 6 May 1999:

Wards from 6 May 1999 to 3 May 2007:

Wards from 3 May 2007 to 1 April 2023:

Sedgemoor

Wards from 1 April 1974 (first election 7 June 1973) to 3 May 1979:

Wards from 3 May 1979 to 6 May 1999:

Wards from 6 May 1999 to 5 May 2011:

Wards from 5 May 2011 to 1 April 2023:

Somerset West and Taunton

Wards from 2 May 2019 to 1 April 2023:

South Somerset

Wards from 1 April 1974 (first election 7 June 1973) to 6 May 1976:

Wards from 6 May 1976 to 2 May 1991:

Wards from 2 May 1991 to 6 May 1999:

Wards from 6 May 1999 to 2 May 2019:

Wards from 2 May 2019 to 1 April 2023:

Taunton Deane

Wards from 1 April 1974 (first election 7 June 1973) to 3 May 1979:

Wards from 3 May 1979 to 6 May 1999:

Wards from 6 May 1999 to 3 May 2007:

Wards from 3 May 2007 to 2 May 2019 (district abolished):

Wansdyke

Wards from 1 April 1974 (first election 7 June 1973) to 6 May 1976:

Wards from 6 May 1976 to 1 April 1996 (district abolished):

West Somerset

Wards from 1 April 1974 (first election 7 June 1973) to 3 May 1979:

Wards from 3 May 1979 to 6 May 1999:

Wards from 6 May 1999 to 5 May 2011:

Wards from 5 May 2011 to 2 May 2019 (district abolished):

Woodspring
Wards from 1 April 1974 (first election 7 June 1973) to 3 May 1979:

Wards from 3 May 1979 to 1 April 1996 (district abolished):

Electoral wards by constituency

Bath
Bathwick, Combe Down, Kingsmead, Lambridge, Lansdown, Moorlands, Newbridge, Odd Down, Oldfield Park, Southdown, Twerton, Walcot, Westmoreland, Weston, Widcombe & Lyncombe.

Bridgwater and West Somerset
Alcombe East, Alcombe West, Aville Vale, Bridgwater Bower, Bridgwater Eastover, Bridgwater Hamp, Bridgwater Quantock, Bridgwater Sydenham, Bridgwater Victoria, Brompton Ralph and Haddon, Cannington and Quantocks, Carhampton and Withycombe, Crowcombe and Stogumber, Dulverton and Brushford, Dunster, East Poldens, Exmoor, Huntspill and Pawlett, King's Isle, Minehead North, Minehead South, North Petherton, Old Cleeve, Porlock and District, Puriton, Quantock Vale, Quarme, Sandford, Watchet, West Poldens, West Quantock, Williton, Woolavington.

North East Somerset
Bathavon North, Bathavon South, Chew Valley, Clutton and Farmborough, High Littleton, Keynsham East, Keynsham North, Keynsham South, Mendip, Midsomer Norton North, Midsomer Norton Redfield, Paulton, Peasedown, Publow and Whitchurch, Radstock, Saltford, Timsbury, Westfield.

North Somerset
Backwell, Clevedon Central, Clevedon East, Clevedon North, Clevedon South, Clevedon Walton, Clevedon West, Clevedon Yeo, Easton-in-Gordano, Gordano, Nailsea East, Nailsea North and West, Pill, Portishead Central, Portishead Coast, Portishead East, Portishead Redcliffe Bay, Portishead South and North Weston, Portishead West, Winford, Wraxall and Long Ashton, Wrington, Yatton.

Somerton and Frome
Beacon, Beckington and Rode, Blackmoor Vale, Bruton, Burrow Hill, Camelot, Cary, Coleford, Creech, Curry Rivel, Frome Berkley Down, Frome Fromefield, Frome Keyford, Frome Park, Frome Welshmill, Islemoor, Langport and Huish, Martock, Mells, Milborne Port, Nordinton, Northstone, Postlebury, Stratton, Tower, Turn Hill, Vale, Wessex, Wincanton.

Taunton Deane
Bishop's Hull, Bishop's Lydeard, Blackdown, Bradford-on-Tone, Comeytrowe, Milverton and North Deane, Monument, Neroche, North Curry, Norton Fitzwarren, Ruishton and Creech, Staplegrove, Stoke St. Gregory, Taunton Blackbrook and Holway, Taunton Eastgate, Taunton Fairwater, Taunton Halcon, Taunton Killams and Mountfield, Taunton Lyngford, Taunton Manor and Wilton, Taunton Pyrland and Rowbarton, Trull, Wellington East, Wellington North, Wellington Rockwell Green and West, West Monkton, Wiveliscombe and West Deane.

Wells
Ashwick and Ston Easton, Avalon, Axbridge, Axe Vale, Berrow, Brent North, Burnham North, Burnham South, Cheddar and Shipham, Chilcompton, Glastonbury St Benedict's, Glastonbury St Edmund's, Glastonbury St John's, Glastonbury St Mary's, Highbridge, Knoll, Knowle, Moor, Nedge, Pylcombe, Rodney and Priddy, St Cuthbert (Out) North and West, Shepton East, Shepton West, Street North, Street South, Street West, Wedmore and Mark, Wells Central, Wells St Cuthbert's, Wells St Thomas’.

Weston-Super-Mare
Banwell and Winscombe, Blagdon and Churchill, Congresbury, Hutton and Locking, Kewstoke, Weston-Super-Mare Central, Weston-Super-Mare Clarence and Uphill, Weston-Super-Mare East, Weston-Super-Mare Milton and Old Worle, Weston-Super-Mare North Worle, Weston-Super-Mare South, Weston-Super-Mare South Worle, Weston-Super-Mare West.

Yeovil
Blackdown, Brympton, Chard Avishayes, Chard Combe, Chard Crimchard, Chard Holyrood, Chard Jocelyn, Coker, Crewkerne, Eggwood, Hamdon, Ilminster, Ivelchester, Neroche, Parrett, St Michael's, South Petherton, Tatworth and Forton, Windwhistle, Yeovil Central, Yeovil East, Yeovil South, Yeovil West, Yeovil Without.

See also
List of parliamentary constituencies in Somerset

References

Wards of Somerset
Somerset
Wards